Church of St. Clara, also known as the St. Clara of Assisi Chapel, is a Roman Catholic church in Assonora, Goa, India. The church was built in 1768 and the religious order based in the Parish of St. Clare Church at Assonora is the Poor Sisters of Our Lady (PSOL), based at the Infant Jesus of Prague Convent, Auchit Waddo in Assonora.

References

Colonial Goa
Monuments and memorials in Goa
Tourist attractions in North Goa district
Roman Catholic churches completed in 1768
1768 establishments in the Portuguese Empire
Roman Catholic churches in Goa
Churches in North Goa district
18th-century Roman Catholic church buildings in India